Eucalyptus is the second solo studio album by American recording artist Avey Tare. It was released on July 21, 2017 as the follow-up to his 2010 solo debut Down There, Eucalyptus is his first solo release following the formation of his band Avey Tare's Slasher Flicks. It was recorded by fellow Animal Collective bandmate Joshua Dibb, and features past collaborators Eyvind Kang and Angel Deradoorian.

Production
A press release by Domino described the album as "an electroacoustic movement through leaves, rocks and dust. Written on sunlit bedroom afternoon in Los Angeles, practiced in the dark early hours of the California twilight, and slept on under Big Sur skies."

Portner wrote the album by himself in 2014, but due to commitments with his band Animal Collective he set the material aside. In an interview with Stereogum, Portner elaborated on the writing of the album: 
His friend and bandmate Josh Dibb proposed properly recording the album in 2016. The two recorded the album together at their respective homes.

Promotion
A week before properly announcing the album, Domino Records mailed out several packages to a handful of recipients. In the package was a tiny puzzle, which displayed the album art once assembled. The label on the box listed the track listing and personnel.

Track listing

The track "Selection of a Place" also appears on Animal Collective's Meeting of the Waters EP, although it is listed on the EP as the "Rio Negro Version". The two tracks only share similarities in lyrics and chord progression.

Personnel
Credits adapted from AllMusic.

 Avey Tare – vocals, guitar, synthesizer
 Eyvind Kang – orchestrations
 Angel Deradoorian – vocals
 Jessika Kenney – vocals
 Susan Alcorn – pedal steel guitars

Charts

References

2017 albums
Avey Tare albums
Domino Recording Company albums